Cervaphis quercus is an aphid species described by Takahashi in 1918.

References

External links

Greenideinae